Ravenscroft Stewart  was an eminent Anglican  priest in the late nineteenth and early twentieth centuries.

Stewart was born in Newton Stewart on 23 June 1845, educated at Loretto; Uppingham and Trinity College, Cambridge and ordained in 1870. After a curacy in Bakewell he was Rector of Pleasley from 1871 to 1883; Vicar of All Saints Ennismore Gardens from 1884 to 1909; Archdeacon of Bristol from 1904 to 1910; and  Archdeacon of North Wilts from 1910 to 1919.

He died at home in Burnham-on-Sea on 16 August 1921. His brother Henry, also a priest, was a member of the Wanderers team which won the FA Cup in 1873; and his son Weston was Bishop in Jerusalem from 1943 to 1957.

References

Archdeacons of Bristol
People educated at Loretto School, Musselburgh
People educated at Uppingham School
Alumni of Trinity College, Cambridge
1845 births
1921 deaths
People from Mansfield District
People from Knightsbridge
People from Burnham-on-Sea
People from Newton Stewart